The Monument Rocks are a group of rocks lying  northeast of Cape Sterneck in the entrance to Curtiss Bay, northern Graham Land, Antarctica. They were roughly charted and given this descriptive name by James Hoseason, First Mate of the sealer Sprightly in 1824.

References

External links

Rock formations of Graham Land
Davis Coast